The 1992 United States presidential election in Mississippi took place on November 3, 1992, as part of the 1992 United States presidential election. Voters chose seven representatives, or electors to the Electoral College, who voted for president and vice president.

Mississippi was won by incumbent President George H. W. Bush (R-Texas) with 49.68% of the popular vote over Governor Bill Clinton (D-Arkansas) with 40.77%. Businessman Ross Perot (I-Texas) finished in third, with 8.72% of the popular vote. Clinton ultimately won the national vote, defeating both incumbent President Bush and Perot.

Mississippi provided Bush with his highest vote percentage in the nation, and was the closest he came to winning an absolute majority in a state. (However, it was only his sixth-best state in margin of victory.) It was Ross Perot's weakest state, and the only one where he failed to win more than 10% of the vote. He only did worse in the District of Columbia. , this is the last election in which Hinds County voted for a Republican presidential candidate and the last election in which Tishomingo County voted for a Democratic presidential candidate.

Results

Results by county

References

Mississippi
1992
1992 Mississippi elections